The Chicago, Rock Island and Pacific Railroad Stone Arch Viaduct, also known as the Old Stone Arch, is located northeast of Shelby, Iowa, United States. The span carried the Chicago, Rock Island and Pacific Railroad tracks over Little Silver Creek. The bridge has flanking wingwalls that measure  in length. Limestone for the bridge was quarried near Earlham, Iowa and transported by train to the site. It is one of two such bridges known to exist in Shelby County. The Rock Island was the first railroad to enter the county, and continued to operate here into the 1950s. At that time they abandoned the line when the Atlantic cutoff was built providing a more direct route between Atlantic, Iowa and Council Bluffs. While the tracks were removed, the stone arch, the railroad grade, and the right-of-way were left intact. They are now part of the Rock Island Old Stone Arch Nature Trail. The bridge was listed on the National Register of Historic Places in 1998.

References

Bridges completed in 1868
Buildings and structures in Shelby County, Iowa
Chicago, Rock Island and Pacific Railroad
Arch bridges in Iowa
Railroad bridges on the National Register of Historic Places in Iowa
National Register of Historic Places in Shelby County, Iowa
Viaducts in the United States
Stone arch bridges in the United States